Edivândio Sequeira dos Reis (born 1 January 1991), commonly known as Edivândio is a Cape Verdean footballer who plays as a forward.

Football career
Edivândio has played 5 games with Marítimo in the Liga Sagres.

Honours
SCM Gloria Buzău
Liga III: 2018–19

References

External links

Edivândio at Zimbru website

1991 births
Living people
People from Mindelo
Cape Verdean footballers
Association football forwards
Primeira Liga players
Liga Portugal 2 players
Campeonato de Portugal (league) players
Moldovan Super Liga players
C.S. Marítimo players
S.C. Beira-Mar players
F.C. Felgueiras 1932 players
U.D. Oliveirense players
S.C. Salgueiros players
FC Zimbru Chișinău players
FC Gloria Buzău players
Cape Verdean expatriate footballers
Cape Verdean expatriate sportspeople in Portugal
Expatriate footballers in Portugal
Cape Verdean expatriate sportspeople in Moldova
Expatriate footballers in Moldova
Cape Verdean expatriate sportspeople in Romania
Expatriate footballers in Romania